Hurricane Odile was the second of three tropical storms to make landfall in Mexico during the 1984 Pacific hurricane season. Curving towards the northwest, Odile became a Category 1 hurricane on September 19. The tropical cyclone reached its peak intensity with winds of  two days later; however, Hurricane Odile began to weaken as moved erratically it encountered less favorable conditions and was downgraded to a tropical storm shortly before making landfall northwest of Zihuatanejo. Over land, the storm rapidly weakened, and dissipated on September 23. Flooding from Odile resulted in the evacuation of 7,000 people, 21 deaths, and the damage of about 900 homes.

Meteorological history

After tracking over  waters, the disturbance began to strengthen, and became a depression at 18:00 UTC on September 17. The depression began to curve more towards the northwest beneath a narrow ridge located over southern Mexico and south of an upper-level low over northern Mexico. About 24 hours after developing into a tropical cyclone, the Eastern Pacific Hurricane Center (EPHC) upgraded the depression to Tropical Storm Odile. At 00:00 UTC on September 20, Odile attained hurricane status while turning towards the east between the ridge and an upper-level low.

Due to a combination of an upper level trough that moved southward over the Baja California Peninsula and the weakening of the ridge, the hurricane began to turn more northwestward. After maintaining peak intensity for 12 hours, Odile started to weaken, as the storm began to encounter cooler sea surface temperatures. Less than six hours later, at 00:00 UTC on September 23, Odile ceased to exist as a tropical cyclone. While its surface circulation rapidly weakened over the mountains of western Mexico, the remnants of Odile moved northwest, passing east of Manzanillo before weakening as it re-curved towards Texas.

Preparations and impact
 
Due to the storm's slow motion, Odile dropped heavy rainfall over a prolonged period across Southern Mexico. Nation-wide, the maximum rainfall totals of  occurred in Costa Azul and Acapulco. In all, Odile, in conjunction with a series of storms that affected the country in 1984, brought the heaviest rains to the region since 1978. Acapulco Mayor Alfonso Arugdin Alcaraz reported that flooding inundated  of highways, damaged roughly 900 homes, and left 20,000 families without running water. According to press reports, flooding triggered an evacuation of 7,000 people across the city, and six people were killed, with two others reported missing. However, these reports were not confirmed because telephone circuits between Acapulco and Mexico City were down.

The city of Zihuatanejo was left without electricity since the hurricane had knocked down two high-tension towers. Throughout Guerrero, 80% of all crops were damaged. Across the Ixtapa-Zihuatanejo corridor, several dozen adobe and other poorly constructed huts had their walls damaged and roofs blown away by strong winds. Slight damage was reported in the area, although there were no reports of injuries or fatalities. Nevertheless, the tourism industry in Acapulco and Ixtapa-Zihuatenejo was severely affected by Odile and the preceding storms, with few foreign tourists visiting the area. Officials estimated that hotels were only 5% full in Acapulco. Overall, a total of 44 riverbanks and 30,000 residents were isolated due to flooding. There were a total of 21 confirmed fatalities from the storm after 18 passengers and 3 crewman drowned on the Atoyac River. As a result of Odile and a combination of other storms that hit the country in 1984, crop losses were estimated at US$60 million, mostly from corn, beans, wheat, rice and sorghum.

See also

Other tropical cyclones named Odile

Notes

References

External links
Weather Underground Tracking
Storms in history like Hurricane Odile
Unisys Weather track data

Odile
Odile 1984
Odile 1984
Hurricane Odile
Odile